Cement is a town in Caddo County, Oklahoma, United States. The population was 501 at the 2010 census.

The community was named for its early cement industry.

Geography
Cement is located near the southeast corner of Caddo County at  (34.935441, -98.137320). U.S. Route 277 passes through the town, leading east then north  to Chickasha and southwest  to Lawton.

Demographics

As of the census of 2000, there were 530 people, 222 households, and 148 families residing in the town. There were 284 housing units at an average density of 628.6 per square mile (243.7/km2). The racial makeup of the town was 86.98% White, 2.64% African American, 8.11% Native American, 0.19% Asian, 0.38% from other races, and 1.70% from two or more races. Hispanic or Latino of any race were 1.89% of the population.

There were 222 households, out of which 28.8% had children under the age of 18 living with them, 53.6% were married couples living together, 11.3% had a female householder with no husband present, and 33.3% were non-families. 29.3% of all households were made up of individuals, and 13.5% had someone living alone who was 65 years of age or older. The average household size was 2.39 and the average family size was 2.96.

In the town, the population was spread out, with 26.0% under the age of 18, 6.8% from 18 to 24, 26.6% from 25 to 44, 24.3% from 45 to 64, and 16.2% who were 65 years of age or older. The median age was 39 years. For every 100 females, there were 87.9 males. For every 100 females age 18 and over, there were 85.8 males.

The median income for a household in the town was $18,625, and the median income for a family was $23,500. Males had a median income of $24,531 versus $17,031 for females. The per capita income for the town was $11,378. About 24.6% of families and 27.2% of the population were below the poverty line, including 35.3% of those under age 18 and 24.7% of those age 65 or over.

Notable person
Blackbear Bosin (1921-1980), Kiowa/Comanche American artist and sculptor, was born and raised near here.
Clinton Manges (1923–2010), Texas oilman

References

External links
 Encyclopedia of Oklahoma History and Culture - Cement

Towns in Caddo County, Oklahoma
Towns in Oklahoma